Ultimate Muscle: Legends vs. New Generation, known in Japan as , is a wrestling video game based on the anime and manga, Ultimate Muscle. It was developed in Japan by AKI Corporation and released in Japan (in 2002) and North America (in 2003) only on the GameCube. This article contains explanations on the PlayStation 2 and PSP versions as well. In this game, the Choujins from the Kinnikuman (Legends) reappear via 3D Polygon and compete against the Nisei Choujins (New Generation) in their younger bodies.

Series
Kinnikuman Nisei: New Generation vs. Legends / Ultimate Muscle: Legends vs. New Generation (GameCube; November 22, 2002 (Japan), June 5, 2003 (U.S.); Bandai)
The first in the series. The characters are presented with cel-shaded animation, looking almost identical to their manga counterparts.

Kinnikuman Generations / Galactic Wrestling: Featuring Ultimate Muscle (PlayStation 2; April 22, 2004 (Japan), June 30, 2004 (U.S.); Bandai)
An expansion of "Ultimate Muscle: Legends vs. New Generation". Released on the 25th Anniversary of Kinnikuman. The Story Mode and Choujin Creation Mode from the first game are removed. Features tag matches and additional characters. The slow loading time and Toshio Furukawa's portrayal of Kinnikuman (replacing Akira Kamiya from the first game) caused the game to disappointment many fans.
Advertising Slogan: 

Kinnikuman Muscle Generations (PlayStation Portable; February 23, 2006; Bandai)
An expansion of "Galactic Wrestling". Contains more characters and Story Modes. Akira Kamiya returns as the voice of Kinnikuman. Tag Team names from the Ultimate Choujin Tag Arc are used.

Reception

The game received "generally favorable reviews" according to video game review aggregator Metacritic. In Japan, Famitsu gave it a score of 27 out of 40.

The editors of GameSpot named Ultimate Muscle the best GameCube game of June 2003, and nominated the title for their 2003 "Best Game No One Played" award, which ultimately went to Amplitude.

References

External links

Kinnikuman Nisei New Generation vs. Legends from Bandai
Aki Corporation

2002 video games
GameCube games
GameCube-only games
Fighting games
Kinnikuman games
Syn Sophia games
Professional wrestling games
Video games developed in Japan
Multiplayer and single-player video games